Čakovec is a city in Northern Croatia, located around  north of Zagreb, the Croatian capital. Čakovec is both the county seat and the largest city of Međimurje County, the northernmost, smallest and most densely populated Croatian county.

Population
The city administrative area of Čakovec includes the following settlements:

 Čakovec, population 15,147
 Ivanovec, population 2,093
 Krištanovec, population 626
 Kuršanec, population 1,584
 Mačkovec, population 1,326
 Mihovljan, population 1,380
 Novo Selo na Dravi, population 634
 Novo Selo Rok, population 1,441
 Savska Ves, population 1,217
 Slemenice, population 244
 Šandorovec, population 335
 Totovec, population 534
 Žiškovec, population 543

The adjacent villages of Belica, Nedelišće, Pribislavec, Strahoninec and Šenkovec are seats of separate municipalities, although they are all located within  of the city's centre.

The total population of the city's metropolitan area, with all of the aforementioned villages is approximately 45,000.

At the 2001 census, the city of Čakovec had a population of 15,790 within its limits, which was a slight decrease from the 1991 census, when it was 15,999. With its surrounding suburbs included it had a population of 30,455 at the 2001 census.

The city's present day population primarily consists of ethnic Croats at 93.8%, with the largest minority being Romani at 3.8% of the municipality. Other ethnic groups are Serbs, Hungarians, Slovenes and Albanians.

History 

According to the geographer Strabo's reports in the 1st century, today's location of the city of Čakovec was the site of Aquama (wet town) in Roman times and at the time a marshland, a military post and a legionnaire camp.

The name Čakovec (or ) comes from the first name of the ispán Csák Hahót. With the beginning of the 13th century he erected the timber fortification which was later named Csák's tower. It was mentioned for the first time in 1328 and the place appeared in the official books in 1333. From 1350 to 1397, it was in the possession of the House of Laczkfy. The town was part of Zala county of the Kingdom of Hungary until 1918 occupation of Međimurje and addition to the Kingdom of Serbs, Croats and Slovenes. The period of more significant economic and cultural growth of Csáktornya is considered to have started in 1547, when Nikola IV Zrinski of Szigetvár became the owner of the area. At that time the castle was lavishly decorated, surrounded by a park and sculptures of famous army leaders and monarchs. Duke Juraj IV Zrinski granted privileges to the inhabitants of the Čakovec fortress and its suburbs on 29 May 1579. This was the starting point for Csáktornya to become a free market town and the date is celebrated today as "City Day". The Čakovec Castle which was owned by the House of Zrinski between the 16th and the 18th century is known today as the "Zrinski Old Town" and is considered the main landmark of the city. It is located in the Zrinski Park only a few steps from the central square.

In 1738 the city was devastated by an earthquake, in 1741 by a large fire, and another earthquake hit it in 1880. At the end of the 18th century, the owners of the town became counts from the Festetics family, and the town was turned into a big estate where industry, crafts and trade developed. In 1848 the ban Josip Jelačić captured Csáktornya from the Hungarians and annexed it with Croatia. Officially it was still part of Zala county. The first railroad track was built here in 1860 and to help connect Budapest with the ports of Fiume and Trieste. The town was connected by railroad with Muraszerdahely and Alsólendva in 1889 and in 1893 electricity was introduced. Csáktornya was the seat of a district in Zala county of the Kingdom of Hungary until 1918 when it was captured by an armed force on behalf of the Kingdom of Serbs, Croats and Slovenes. It again became part of Hungary between 1941-44 during World War II, until it was captured on the 6 April 1945 by the Soviet Red Army with Marshal Fyodor Tolbukhin in command.

Recent years 
In the late 1990s and throughout the 2000s several modern buildings were built and opened to the public. In 1999 a brand new fitness complex including four indoor swimming pools and a jacuzzi was opened as part of the city's center for sports and recreation. In 2003 a renovated sports hall, originally built in the 1970s and belonging to the construction industry high school, was also opened as a part of the center for sports and recreation and hosted several group matches of the 2003 World Women's Handball Championship. Beginning in the late 1990s and early 2000s several large shopping centers and car showrooms emerged in the city, mostly in its northwestern part. Čakovec was twice rewarded The Green Flower award for the tidiest continental city in Croatia, in 2008 and 2009. 
Čakovec is the first city of the former Yugoslavia to have installed completely electronic information spots, located at the Republic Square and the Franciscan Square in the Center and at the Square of Saint Anthony of Padua in the Jug district. Čakovec is known as the city of traffic circles, because, during the late 1990s and early 2000s, all of its traffic lights in the inner part of the city were removed and replaced with traffic circles or rotaries, virtually eliminating traffic jams. The only remaining traffic lights in the city are located on the southern bypass. Although Čakovec is a small city by global parameters, its large working force which comes from all over the county, its location and importance in the region caused many traffic jams on the crossroads. 
Čakovec is home of many famous Croatian punk bands, including Bakterije and Motorno Ulje.

Education 

The city of Čakovec currently has three elementary schools and several secondary schools including a Gymnasium and three high schools that offer education in the fields of technology, crafts, economics and construction. The Teacher's Training College is the city's only institution for higher education that lasts more than 3 years. In recent years, the city opened its own institution of higher education called MEV - Međimursko veleučilište u Čakovcu (Polytechnic of Međimurje in Čakovec), offering 3-year studies (180 ECTS points) in Computer Science and Management of Tourism and Sport. The city is also known for its School of Animated Film (ŠAF - Škola Animiranog Filma), which has been hosting an annual international animated film summer workshop for several decades, bringing world-renowned animators to Čakovec.

Economy 

The city of Čakovec has a highly developed industry and it is the focal point for communication, business, trade and education in the Međimurje County. The economy of the city is based on textile, footwear, food processing and metal plants. The Čakovec-based company TIZ Zrinski is the largest printing and publishing company in the county as well as one of the major such companies in northern Croatia. Many books published in the country are printed in this factory. The city is also a base for several companies engaged in construction, production of building materials, and plastics. Some of the largest companies based in the city include the textile and clothing manufacturers Čateks and Međimurska trikotaža Čakovec (MTČ) as well as the footwear manufacturer Jelen, while the companies Čakovečki mlinovi (bakery) and Vajda (meat products) are major fresh food producers in the city. Promming is also one of the biggest factories in Čakovec, they produce metal shelves designed specially for supermarkets.

Sights, facilities and events 
Most of the historical buildings in Čakovec are located in the town center or in the centrally located Zrinski Park, and the town's historical core has been well preserved. The Čakovec Castle near the park houses a museum with some 17,000 exhibits. Other landmark buildings in the town centre are a palace built in the Vienna Secession style, and Saint Nicholas' Church. The Southern Čakovec is a relatively new neighborhood, with modern houses and buildings including the Church of Saint Anthony of Padua and a new elementary school with a sports hall, outdoor basketball and handball grounds and a running track.

The city has a casino, designed by architect Henrik Böhm.

At the central square there is a library, a theater, a cinema, a large shopping center and a few confectioners' shops and restaurants. Other businesses in the town center are mostly clothing stores, bookshops, electronics stores and finance companies. A hospital and the central bus station are located only a few steps from town centre. The largest hotel in Čakovec is located across the park, about 300–400 meters from the central square, and there is also a smaller one in close proximity of the main square.

Transportation 
The city of Čakovec is easily accessible by road or a railroad track. The road infrastructure is good and includes a new expressway connecting the Hungary border-crossing point in Goričan with Zagreb, Karlovac and the Adriatic Sea coast. There is also a southern bypass which was built in the beginning of the second half of the first decade in the 21st century. The city is connected to local municipalities with an efficient public transportation system. It has two train stations: Čakovec main train station and Čakovec-Buzovec, as well as a central bus station with a taxi rank, located near the central square. In the adjacent village of Pribislavec there's a small sports airport, where an annual aero-meeting takes place, as well as panoramic flights over the city and county in the summer. The airport is located approximately three kilometers east from the downtown.

City districts and neighborhoods 

The city districts/neighborhoods of Čakovec are:
I. Centar
II. Jug
III. Martane
IV. Buzovec
V. Sajmište
VI. Globetka
VII. Špice

Sports 
The sports-related activities in the city of Čakovec are mostly centered in its northwestern part, where the center for sports and recreation is located. The center includes a football and athletics stadium with 7,000 places, an indoor hall mostly used for handball, basketball and volleyball matches and a swimming pool complex, where several swimming schools are organized throughout the year.

Sports clubs 
 IHK Pozoji, an inline hockey club
 KK Željezničar Čakovec   - ninepin bowling club
 KK Međimurje, a basketball club
 NK Međimurje, a football club in the Croatian Second League
 ŽRK Zrinski, a women's handball club in the Croatian First League
 MRK Čakovec, a handball club in the Croatian First League of Handball
 TK Franjo Punčec, a tennis club
 Disc Golf club Zrinski

International relations

Twin towns — Sister cities
Čakovec is currently twinned with these cities or municipalities:

Notable people 

This list contains some of the notable people who were either born in Čakovec, lived in the city for a longer time or were in some significant way related to it.

 Lidija Bajuk (born 1965) a Croatian singer-songwriter and poet.
 Lujo Bezeredi (1898–1979) a Croatian-Hungarian sculptor and painter.
 Stanka Gjurić (born 1956) a Croatian poet, essayist, actress and filmmaker.
 Sunčana Glavak (born 1968) a Croatian politician and MEP
 Barbara Kolar (born 1970) a Croatian actress and TV presenter
 Ladislav Kralj-Međimurec (1891–1976) a Croatian painter and engraver.
 Josip Horvat Međimurec (1904–1945), a Croatian painter.
 Josip Movčan (1924–2016) a Croatian forester with the Plitvice Lakes National Park.
 Rudolf Steiner (1861–1925) an Austrian occultist, social reformer, architect and claimed clairvoyant.
 Josip Štolcer-Slavenski (1896– 1955) a Croatian composer and Music professor
 Sandor Teszler (1903–2000), industrialist and philanthropist in the US
 Vinko Žganec (1890-1976) a Croatian ethnomusicologist and folklorist
 Juraj IV Zrinski (1549–1603), soldier, politician and patron
 Juraj V Zrinski (1599–1626), soldier and politician
 Nikola IV Zrinski (ca.1508–1566), soldier and politician.
 Nikola VII Zrinski (1620–1664), soldier, poet and philosopher.
 Petar Zrinski (1621–1671), soldier, politician and poet

Sport 
 Srećko Bogdan (born 1957), a Croatian former footballer with 507 club caps
 Branko Ivanković (born 1954), footballer with 269 club caps and manager in Iranian Pro League 
 Robert Jarni (born 1968), footballer with 391 club caps and manager
 Dino Kresinger (born 1982), footballer with over 320 club caps
 Dražen Ladić (born 1963), football goalkeeper with 420 club caps and 59 for Croatia
 Ladislav Legenstein (born 1926) an Austrian tennis player and a Wimbledon doubles semifinalist
 Ivana Lisjak (born 1987), retired tennis player
 Franjo Punčec (1913–1985) a Yugoslav tennis player.
 Filip Ude (born 1986), pommel horse gymnast; silver medallist at the 2008 Summer Olympics
 Dario Vizinger (born 1998), footballer with almost 200 club caps

References

External links 

 
Čakovec Online news portal 
Čakovec Tourist Board  

 
Populated places in Međimurje County
Cities and towns in Croatia
13th-century establishments in Croatia